James Luke Ede (born 19 September 1984) is an English cricketer. Ede is a right-handed batsman who bowls right-arm medium pace. He was born at Burton-on-Trent, Staffordshire.

Ede played a single List-A match for the Derbyshire Cricket Board in the 1st round of the 2003 Cheltenham & Gloucester Trophy against the Middlesex Cricket Board, a match which was played in 2002.  During the match he scored 10 runs and took a single wicket, that of Rajesh Rao.

In local domestic cricket, Ede plays for Quarndon Cricket Club who play in the Derbyshire Premier Cricket League.

References

External links
James Ede at Cricinfo
James Ede at CricketArchive

1984 births
Living people
Sportspeople from Burton upon Trent
Sportspeople from Staffordshire
English cricketers
Derbyshire Cricket Board cricketers